Ewa Maria Kubicka is a Polish mathematician interested in graph theory and actuarial science. She is known for introducing the concept of the chromatic sum of a graph, the minimum possible sum when the vertices are labeled by natural numbers with no two adjacent vertices having equal labels.

Kubicka studied mathematics at Wrocław University of Science and Technology beginning in 1974, and earned a master's degree there in 1979. She came to Western Michigan University for graduate study, earning both a master's degree in computer science and a Ph.D. in mathematics in 1989. Her dissertation, The Chromatic Sum and Efficient Tree Algorithms, was supervised by Allen J. Schwenk. She became an assistant professor at Emory University and then, in 1990, moved to the University of Louisville, where she has been a full professor since 2004. At Louisville, she directs the actuarial program and is undergraduate advisor for mathematics.

She is known for having an erdős number of one.

Selected publications
.
.
.
.
.
.
.
.
.
.
.

References

Year of birth missing (living people)
Living people
Polish mathematicians
Polish women mathematicians
20th-century American mathematicians
21st-century American mathematicians
American women mathematicians
Graph theorists
Wrocław University of Technology alumni
Western Michigan University alumni
Emory University faculty
University of Louisville faculty
20th-century women mathematicians
21st-century women mathematicians
20th-century American women
21st-century American women